Sir Charles Talbot, 2nd Baronet (8 November 1751 – 3 November 1812)  was a British politician.

A member of a junior branch of the Talbot family headed by the Earl of Shrewsbury, Talbot was the son of Sir Charles Henry Talbot, 1st Baronet, son of Major-General Sherrington Talbot, son of William Talbot, Bishop of Durham. Charles Talbot, 1st Baron Talbot was his uncle and William Talbot, 1st Earl Talbot, his cousin. He sat as Member of Parliament for Weobly from 1800 to 1802, for Rye from 1803 to 1806 and for Bletchingley in 1812.

Talbot never married. He died in November 1812, aged 60, and was succeeded in the title by his younger brother, George.

References

External links 
 

1751 births
1812 deaths
Baronets in the Baronetage of Ireland
Members of the Parliament of Great Britain for English constituencies
British MPs 1796–1800
Members of the Parliament of the United Kingdom for English constituencies
UK MPs 1801–1802
UK MPs 1802–1806
UK MPs 1812–1818
Charles